David Miles (born 1954) is a British continuity announcer and newsreader on BBC Radio 4.

Biography 

David Miles joined the BBC in 1975 as a studio manager. Initially working at Bush House, he then transferred to Broadcasting House. Between 1984 and 1987, and again between 1988 and 12 June 1995, he worked as a BBC Television announcer. In the summer of 1995 he became an announcer on Channel 4, but he later rejoined Radio 4.  He has also announced for the UK version of the History Channel.

References 

1954 births
BBC Radio 4 presenters
British radio personalities
Living people
Radio and television announcers